Murder is an American ten-episode reality television competition program which premiered on Spike TV on July 31, 2007. Because of explicit photos of corpses and gruesome materials, the series is not suitable for children under 16. After the second airing, the show moved from 10:00 PM to midnight. The final episode aired on October 9, 2007.

Summary
Two teams of civilians investigate a real crime scene and have 48 hours before they must present their findings to detective Tommy Le Noir, after which Le Noir describes what happened at the actual crime scene, how the real investigators came up with their findings. He evaluates the teams and tells them how well they conducted their investigation. The prize is a donation made to a victim's charity.

Episodes
The following is the listing of the episodes, and the real-life murder cases on which the episodes were based:

References

External links
 Overview of Murder: "Everything About Murder Series"
 

2000s American reality television series
2007 American television series debuts
2007 American television series endings
Spike (TV network) original programming
Television series by Bunim/Murray Productions